Gracia Querejeta Marín (born 13 August 1962) is a Spanish filmmaker.

Biography 
Born in Madrid in 1962, daughter to film producer Elías Querejeta and costume designer María del Carmen Marín. She studied Ancient History in the Universidad Complutense de Madrid. She worked as an actress before developing her director career. Her debut as director began in 1988 with short films as Tres en la marca. Her first feature film was Una estación de paso (1992).

Films

Short films 
 Tres en la marca (1988), chapter 7 Serie 7 Huellas
 El viaje del agua (1990)
La adolescencia (1992)
El trabajo de rodar (1993)
Alfredo di Stefano (1997)
Primarias (1998) Documentary with Fernando León de Aranoa and Azucena Rodríguez.
Felices 140 (2015)

Feature films 
Robert Rylands' Last Journey (El último viaje de Robert Rylands) (1994)
By My Side Again (Cuando vuelvas a mi lado) (1999)
Héctor (2004)
Seven Billiard Tables (Siete mesas de billar francés) (2007)
15 Years and One Day (2013)
Felices 140 (2015)
Crime Wave (Ola de crímenes) (2018)
Invisibles (2020)

Actress 

 Las secretas intenciones (1969)
Dulces horas by Carlos Saura, actress (1981)
Las palabras de Max by Emilio Martínez Lázaro, actress (1975)

Awards
Héctor (2004). Biznaga de Oro for Best Film at the Malaga Film Festival (Festival de Málaga de Cine Español).
Cuando vuelvas a mi lado (1999). Special Jury Mention in Festival de San Sebastián
Una estación de paso (1992). Jury Special prize in Semana de Cine de Valladolid.
Tres en la marca, (1988) Premio Teatro Arriaga en el Festival de Cortometrajes de Bilbao.
El último viaje de Robert Rylands (1994). Best Director, Best Movie, Best Photography, Best Film Editing and Best Music in Círculo de Escritores Cinematográficos.
El viaje del agua, (1990) premio Goya Best Spanish Documentar

See also
 List of female film and television directors

References

External links

1962 births
Living people
Actresses from Madrid
Film directors from Madrid
Spanish film actresses
Complutense University of Madrid alumni
Spanish women film directors
Spanish people of Basque descent
21st-century Spanish screenwriters